This is a list of ambassadors to Slovenia. Note that some ambassadors are responsible for more than one country while others are directly accredited to Ljubljana.

Current Ambassadors to Ljubljana

See also
 Foreign relations of Slovenia
 List of diplomatic missions of Slovenia
 List of diplomatic missions in Slovenia

References

 

List
 
Slovenia